Rosannagh "Rosie" MacLennan (born August 28, 1988) is a Canadian trampoline gymnast. She is the 2013 and 2018 World Trampoline champion, 2012 and 2016 Olympic champion, and 2011 and 2015 Pan American Games champion in the individual trampoline event. MacLennan was the Canadian National Women's champion in 2005, 2009 and 2011, and in 2007 was the World Champion in synchronized trampoline with Karen Cockburn. She has also won five silver and four bronze medals in World Championship competition in both the individual and synchro events. MacLennan trains at Skyrider's Trampoline Place in Richmond Hill, Ontario, with coach David Ross, who has coached all of Canada's Olympic trampolinists.

Background
MacLennan was born in the township of King, Ontario. Her parents are Jane and John MacLennan. Her grandfather was selected as a gymnast for the 1940 Summer Olympics in Tokyo, but was unable to compete as the games were cancelled due to the outbreak of World War II. Rosie MacLennan also suffered a mild concussion before the 2015 Pan Am Games in Toronto.

Career
MacLennan has competed internationally at various levels since 1999. In 2006, she paired with her training partner, the Olympian Karen Cockburn, in synchronized trampoline and the pair would go on to dominate the event internationally, winning eight consecutive World Cup events including the World Cup Finals in Birmingham in 2006. That year she also graduated from King City Secondary School, where she was a cheerleader during her final year.

In the 2007 World Championships in Quebec City they again won the event The pair hold the current female synchronized trampoline routine world record for difficulty with a DD of 14.20 which they scored in April 2007 at the Lake Placid Trampoline World Cup. Her results at the 2007 World Championships qualified her for the 2008 Summer Olympics in Beijing.

Following the 2007 World Championships, MacLennan came in second place in the Good Luck Beijing International Invitational Tournament, a competition held to test the facilities and organization for the 2008 Beijing Olympic Games. In June 2008, she was selected to join Karen Cockburn and Jason Burnett as one of Canada's three trampoline gymnasts at the 2008 Summer Olympics in Beijing. In the trampoline preliminary competition, she qualified in 3rd place for the Finals but eventually finished in 7th place.

After the 2008 Olympics, MacLennan won the 2009 Canadian Women's Individual title. She came in 4th place for individual trampoline in the 2009 Trampoline World Championships in St Petersburg and 3rd place for individual trampoline in the 2010 Trampoline World Championships in Metz. In 2011, she again won the Canadian Championships and came in 1st place at the Pan American Games in Guadalajara, Mexico and 2nd place in the 2011 Trampoline World Championships in Birmingham which won a place for Canadian women in the Trampoline event for the 2012 London Olympics. She obtained a Bachelor of Physical and Health Education degree from the University of Toronto in November 2011 and is returning to University of Toronto's Faculty of Kinesiology and Physical Education to pursue a master's degree.

Her next major competition was at the 2012 Gymnastics Olympic Test Event, held in the same location as the Olympics. MacLennan won that event against some of the Olympic competitors that she would later face. In May 2012 she suffered a concussion and had to be cautious in her training, missing the 2012 Canadian Trampoline Championships. However at the 2012 Summer Olympics in London, she put on her best performance ever with a finals routine of 57.305, which was the gold-medal winning score for Canada. This was the first and only gold medal for Canada at these games and the first Canadian trampoline gold medal ever. She commented on her gold medal performance: "I was shocked. It's the biggest score that I've ever gotten and I knew that it would be a tough one to catch. But you never want to get ahead of yourself, you want to wait until all the competitors are done." There were three competitors left to compete. The two Chinese competitors were both considered good gold medal prospects, but neither managed to beat her score, confirming the gold for MacLennan. China's He Wenna fell at the end of her performance but narrowly beat out MacLennan's Canadian teammate Karen Cockburn for the bronze medal. MacLennan's result as Canada's only gold-medal winner brought out support in Canada for her to be the nation's flagbearer for the closing ceremony; however, soccer player Christine Sinclair was eventually given the honour, to a little controversy.

In November 2013, MacLennan won the gold medal at the World Championship in Sofia, Bulgaria.

In May 2014, MacLennan won the Canadian National Championship in Ottawa. During training before the 2015 Pan American Games, she sustained a mild concussion when she landed on the side of a trampoline. She won the women's trampoline event at the Pan American Games two weeks later, then undertook physical and cognitive rest to recover from the concussion. She stated that she was "having some issues with spatial awareness" after the concussion with symptoms including headaches, dizziness, and photosensitivity. The concussion's effects were resolved over five months of rest, mental exercises, and finally physical exercise. She conducted exercises with a vestibular ocular therapist to restore her balance and timing, and began doing flips again by November 2015.

In 2016, she won the Canadian National Championship in Edmonton.

MacLennan was Canada's flagbearer in the opening ceremony of the 2016 Summer Olympics. She successfully defended her Olympic title on August 12, 2016.  She is the first Canadian to do so in an individual sport at the Summer Olympics and the first trampolinist, male or female, to successfully defend their Olympic title.

She competed at the 2020 Summer Olympics.

Personal life

MacLennan married Nick Snow, former University of Toronto basketball star, in 2018.

References

External links
 
 
 
 
 

1988 births
Living people
Canadian female trampolinists
Olympic gymnasts of Canada
Gymnasts at the 2007 Pan American Games
Gymnasts at the 2008 Summer Olympics
Gymnasts at the 2011 Pan American Games
King City Secondary School alumni
Sportspeople from King, Ontario
Gymnasts at the 2012 Summer Olympics
Olympic gold medalists for Canada
Olympic medalists in gymnastics
Medalists at the 2012 Summer Olympics
Medalists at the 2016 Summer Olympics
Gymnastics people from Ontario
University of Toronto alumni
Gymnasts at the 2015 Pan American Games
Pan American Games gold medalists for Canada
Pan American Games silver medalists for Canada
Gymnasts at the 2016 Summer Olympics
Pan American Games medalists in gymnastics
Canadian people of Scottish descent
Medalists at the Trampoline Gymnastics World Championships
Competitors at the 2009 World Games
Medalists at the 2015 Pan American Games
Medalists at the 2011 Pan American Games
Gymnasts at the 2020 Summer Olympics